The Memetic Computing Society is a society focusing on research in the area of memetic algorithms and evolutionary computation. The society is located in Singapore.

Conferences
The Memetic Computing Society supports the following conferences.

 The IEEE/WIC/ACM International Joint Conference on Web Intelligence and Intelligent Agent Technology (WI-IAT).

See also
 Association for Computing Machinery
 ACM SIGAI
 IEEE Computer Society

References

External links
 Official web site
 Release

Information technology organizations based in Asia
Organisations based in Singapore